Dadash Kazikhanovich Kazikhanov (born 15 September 1979) is a former Russian professional football player.

Club career
He played 5 seasons in the Russian Football National League for FC SKA-Energiya Khabarovsk.

References

External links
 

1979 births
Living people
Russian footballers
Association football defenders
FC KAMAZ Naberezhnye Chelny players
FC Dynamo Barnaul players
FC SKA-Khabarovsk players
FC Zvezda Irkutsk players
FC Dynamo Bryansk players